The women's halfpipe event in freestyle skiing at the 2014 Winter Olympics in Sochi, Russia is currently taking place, on 20 February 2014. In April 2011 freestyle halfpipe was added to the Olympic program, meaning the event is making its Olympic debut.

Results

Qualification

Q – Qualified for final; DNS – Did not start

Final

References

Women's freestyle skiing at the 2014 Winter Olympics